Kirishima Kazuhiro (Japanese: 霧島 一博, born April 3, 1959) is a former sumo wrestler from Makizono, Kagoshima, Japan, who held the second highest rank of ōzeki from 1990 to 1992 and won one top division tournament championship, and was runner up in seven others. He is now known as Michinoku Oyakata and is the head coach of Michinoku stable.

Early career
Beginning his career in March 1975, Kazumi Yoshinaga, as he then was, joined the Izutsu stable. He was given the sumo name Kirishima, which came from the national park in his native Kagoshima Prefecture. He did not become established as an elite sekitori wrestler until November 1983 when he produced a 9–6 score at the rank of jūryō 10 (he had made the jūryō division briefly in May 1982 but had lasted only one tournament there). He reached the top makuuchi division for the first time in July 1984, and won a sanshō or special prize for Fighting Spirit in his very first tournament. His good looks and slim build made him popular with female sumo fans, and he was sometimes called "the Alain Delon of Japan."

Persistently struggling to gain weight, he enlisted the help of his girlfriend and future wife Naoko in the quest to bulk up and avoid frequent defeats by simple push-out. He was also a fitness fanatic who started his career by running several kilometres even before morning training started at 6am.

One of the lightest wrestlers in the division, Kirishima earned a reputation as a giant-killer, defeating heavyweights such as Ōnokuni and Konishiki several times. However, he seemed to struggle when promoted out of the maegashira ranks. After finishing tournament runner-up and winning the Technique Prize in November 1986 he was promoted to the san'yaku ranks for the first time at sekiwake in the following tournament but could only manage a 3–12 record, and when he finally managed to return to san'yaku at komusubi rank in January 1989 he recorded a dismal 1–14. However, later that year he began a new training regime. In addition to his usual practice matches at Izutsu stable, he did regular weight training at a private gymnasium, and supplemented his normal sumo diet with a specially prepared high calorie and high protein drink. His efforts paid off. He returned to komusubi in November 1989 scoring 10 wins, and then turned in an 11–4 mark and runner-up performance in January 1990. In March 1990 at sekiwake he produced a superb 13–2 record, defeating yokozuna Chiyonofuji (for the first time in twelve attempts) and Hokutoumi and all three ōzeki. He took part in a rare three-way playoff with Konishiki and Hokutoumi, who had also finished on 13–2. Although Hokutoumi took the title, after the tournament Kirishima was promoted to ōzeki. It was his second straight runner-up performance, earning him his third Outstanding Performance and fourth Technique Prizes, and a three tournament record of 34 wins and 11 losses.

Ōzeki
Kirishima had reached sumo's second highest rank at the age of nearly 31, and the 91 tournaments it took him is the slowest ever promotion to ōzeki. The highlight of his career came in January 1991 when he took his first yūshō or tournament title, gaining his revenge on Hokutoumi by defeating him on the last day. He defeated three yokozuna on three consecutive days in this tournament, a feat not achieved again by a non-yokozuna until Kotoshōgiku did it in January 2016. It was also the first top division championship for Izutsu stable in over sixty years. It had taken him a record 96 career tournaments to win a top division yūshō for the first time, and he was also the oldest first time winner at 31 years and nine months. (Both of these records are now held by Kyokutenhō.) Kirishima finished 1991 with 62 wins, which was more than any other top division wrestler in the calendar year, although it was the lowest number ever needed to achieve that feat. He was only the second non-yokozuna after Wakashimazu in 1984 to do so. He was also runner-up in the tournaments of September 1991, March 1992 and July 1992. However, in September of that year he could only manage a 7–8 score after being restricted by an elbow injury, and he had to pull out of the November tournament on Day 8 with only one win after he ruptured ankle ligaments in a bout against Mitoizumi. As a result, he lost his ōzeki status.

Later career and retirement
Rather than retire, Kirishima chose to carry on fighting in the maegashira ranks. Rather unusually for a former ōzeki, he did not own toshiyori (elder) stock in the Sumo Association and so would have had to borrow a share from an active wrestler or use his own fighting name for a three year grace period if he had retired at that point. The cost of stock had risen sharply and his main sponsor, a real estate company, was going through financial difficulties. In May 1994 he fought fellow ex-ōzeki Konishiki, the first time in 35 years that two former ōzeki had met in the maegashira ranks (Ōuchiyama vs Mitsuneyama in 1959 was the previous occasion). The two rivals became friends off the dohyo, and finished with a head-to-head split evenly at 19 wins each in 38 encounters. 

In March 1996 he produced a poor 3–12 record, and facing certain demotion to jūryō, he announced his retirement after 21 years in the sport, just short of his 37th birthday. He was the oldest wrestler in any of the professional sumo divisions at the time of his retirement, and was the last active wrestler born in the 1950s.  As well as a loss of physical strength and an accumulation of injuries he had lost about 10 kilos in weight since his ōzeki days. He at first borrowed his stablemate Terao's Shikoroyama elder name, then when that was needed by the retiring Kotogaume he used Tagaryū's Katsunoura name before securing the Michinoku name and becoming the head of the Michinoku stable in December 1997. He has produced several wrestlers with top division experience, including Jūmonji, Toyozakura and Hakuba. In February 2010 he was elected to the Sumo Association's board of Directors, but was forced to step down from his post in April 2011 when four of his wrestlers (Jūmonji, Toyozakura, Hakuba and Kirinowaka) were ordered to retire after being found guilty of match-fixing. The stable absorbed Izutsu stable, Kirishima's old heya, in October 2019.

He manages a chanko restaurant, Chanko Kirishima, on Kokugikan Street in Ryogoku, which is one of the more successful restaurants run by ex-wrestlers.

Fighting style
Kirishima was a yotsu sumo wrestler who preferred grappling techniques to pushing and thrusting. His favoured grip on the opponent's mawashi was hidari-yotsu, a right hand outside, left hand inside position. His most common winning kimarite was yorikiri (force out), and he was also fond of uwatedashinage (pulling overarm throw) and utchari (ring edge throw), the latter of which he memorably used to defeat yokozuna Ōnokuni in September 1988, his first ever kinboshi. His trademark, however, was tsuri-dashi (lift out), a technique requiring tremendous strength and seldom seen today due to the increasing weight of wrestlers and the risk of back injury. Kirishima used tsuri-dashi 29 times in the 15-year period from January 1990, more than any other wrestler. He used it to defeat Chiyonofuji on the sixth day of the March 1990 tournament, leaving Chiyonofuji stuck on 999 wins and delaying the celebrations in the stadium of what would have been the yokozuna's 1000th career victory.

Career record

See also
Glossary of sumo terms
List of past sumo wrestlers
List of sumo elders
List of sumo tournament top division champions
List of sumo tournament top division runners-up
List of ōzeki

References

External links
 Kirishima's tournament results

1959 births
Living people
Japanese sumo wrestlers
Sumo people from Kagoshima Prefecture
Ōzeki